Frétoy is a commune in the Seine-et-Marne department in the Île-de-France region in north-central France.

Geography
The village lies in the middle of the commune, on the left bank of the Aubetin, which flows westward through the commune.

Demographics
Inhabitants of Frétoy are called Frétoysiens.

See also
Communes of the Seine-et-Marne department

References

External links

1999 Land Use, from IAURIF (Institute for Urban Planning and Development of the Paris-Île-de-France région) 

Communes of Seine-et-Marne